Adam John Hose (born 25 October 1992) is an English cricketer who plays for Warwickshire County Cricket Club. He is a right-handed batsman, who also bowls right-arm medium-fast pace.

Domestic career 
Hose joined Somerset on a 14-month contract in July 2015, and made his debut in the 2015 NatWest t20 Blast against Hampshire. On 3 July 2016 he made his first-class debut for Somerset during Pakistan's tour of England.

On 26 July 2017, Hose rejected the offer of a new three-year contract from Somerset to join Warwickshire with immediate effect. On 30 July 2017, Hose scored a match-winning 76 off 43 balls on debut for Warwickshire against Lancashire in the 2017 NatWest t20 Blast.

In December 2018, he was signed by the Wellington Firebirds to play in the 2018–19 Super Smash in New Zealand. In April 2022, he was bought by the Northern Superchargers for the 2022 season of The Hundred.

In August 2022, he was picked by the Adelaide Strikers to play in the 2022–23 Big Bash League season. On 31 December 2022, he struck his maiden half-century in Big Bash League, scoring unbeaten 56 runs off 41 balls for Adelaide Strikers against the Melbourne Stars.

References

External links
 
 Adam Hose at Warwickshire County Cricket Club

1992 births
Living people
English cricketers
Somerset cricketers
Warwickshire cricketers
North v South cricketers
Wellington cricketers
People from Newport, Isle of Wight
Northern Superchargers cricketers